"Don't Rush Me" is a song written by Alexandra Forbes and Jeff Franzel and performed by American singer Taylor Dayne. It was produced by Ric Wake. The song was released in the late summer of 1988 as the fourth single from Dayne's debut album Tell it to My Heart. The cover art of the single was used on the reissue of the album.

Reception and charts
The single reached number 2 on the Billboard Hot 100 for one week (on January 21, 1989; it was behind Phil Collins's "Two Hearts"), becoming Dayne's highest-charting single at the time, as well as number 3 on the Adult Contemporary chart and number 6 on the Dance chart. The music video also earned heavy rotation on VH-1 and MTV.  The music video featured Dayne performing live during her promotional tour.

UK track list
Extended Version 7:15
Dub Version 5:41
Single Version 3:47
"In the Darkness"

Charts

Weekly charts

Year-end charts

References

1988 singles
Taylor Dayne songs
Song recordings produced by Ric Wake
Music videos directed by Alek Keshishian
1987 songs
1988 songs
Arista Records singles
Songs written by Jeff Franzel
Cashbox number-one singles